Vellathooval is a 2009 Malayalam movie by I. V. Sasi and also the last film done by him, starring Rejith Menon, Nithya Menen and Lalu Alex. It is about a crazy girl and her journey with a poor friend.

Plot 
Jiya, daughter of James and Lisa and Mrs Koshi's granddaughter, enjoyed her teenage-like a 'white feather' (Vellathooval). She is very conservative and has her own views. Manu gets fed up with his life. After his father's death, his mother marries Zachariya. He is always drunk and tortures Manu and his mom. So Manu fights with him and leaves home. He thinks he could become a murderer if he stays at home. Meantime Jiya also leaves her home. She goes with Manu. Manu advises Jiya to go back home many times, but she didn't agree with him. Simultaneously Jiya and Manu were becoming very good friends but society misunderstood them and considered them lovers. Her uncle the City Police Commissioner Abi and his teams search every corner for them. At last, a drunken young college mate Willy attacks Manu, and to save her best friend's life Jiya stabs Willy in the stomach. He dies in the hospital. Willy's friends and police follow Jiya and Manu. Jiya realises her mistake and surrenders herself to police and also saves Manu from Willy's friends. The movie ends with showing Jiya staying in Jail.

Cast 

 Rejith Menon as Manu
 Nithya Menen as Jiya James
 Lalu Alex as Jimmy 
 Seetha as Sofiya
 Jagathy Sreekumar
 Revathi
 Seema as Lizy James
 Shweta Menon
 Athmiya Rajan as Reshmi
 K. B. Ganesh Kumar as Comm.Aby
 Vijayaraghavan as Zachariya
 Sithara as Sheela Aby
 Manju Satheesh as teacher
 Sreelatha Namboothiri as Mrs. Koshy
 Ambika Mohan as Highrange Janu
 Deepika Mohan
 Rohit Nair

Reception 

Sify.com wrote "In all fairness, the fact that there is a storyline with some messages in the film. As you come out of the theatres, the immediate feeling will be that things could have been really different with better visuals, haunting music, and a tighter script. On simpler terms, Vellathooval would have been an okay movie, if it had come at least two decades ago!" Paresh C Palicha from Rediff.com wrote "In conclusion, Vellathooval is disappointing considering there are veterans like director I V Sasi and writer John Paul associated with it."

References

External links 
 

2009 films
2000s Malayalam-language films
Films directed by I. V. Sasi
Films scored by Johnson